Jack Edward Tanner (January 28, 1919 – January 10, 2006) was a United States district judge of the United States District Court for the Eastern District of Washington and the United States District Court for the Western District of Washington.

Education and career
Born in Tacoma, Washington, Tanner was in the United States Army during World War II, from 1943 to 1945. He worked as a longshoreman in Tacoma until his graduation from law school. He received a Bachelor of Laws from the University of Washington School of Law in 1955. He was in private practice in Tacoma from 1955 to 1978. He was a regional leader of the NAACP from 1957 to 1965.

Federal judicial service
On January 20, 1978, Tanner was nominated by President Jimmy Carter to a joint seat on the United States District Court for the Eastern District of Washington and the United States District Court for the Western District of Washington, vacated by Judge William Nelson Goodwin. Tanner was confirmed by the United States Senate on May 17, 1978, and received his commission on May 19, 1978, becoming the first black federal judge in the northwest United States. On November 8, 1978, Tanner was reassigned to the Western District alone. He assumed senior status on January 28, 1991, serving in that capacity until his death of pancreatic cancer, on January 10, 2006, in Tacoma.

See also 
 List of African-American federal judges
 List of African-American jurists
 List of first minority male lawyers and judges in West Virginia

References

Sources

1919 births
2006 deaths
Judges of the United States District Court for the Western District of Washington
Judges of the United States District Court for the Eastern District of Washington
United States district court judges appointed by Jimmy Carter
20th-century American judges
African-American judges
United States Army personnel of World War II
University of Washington School of Law alumni
NAACP activists